Ahman is a given name and a surname, which in Nordic countries is written as Åhman. Notable people with the name include:
Given name
Ahman Green, American football running back 
Ahman Pategi, Former Northern Nigeria first minister
Surname
Arne Åhman (1925–2022), Swedish athlete
Pauline Åhman (1812–1904), Swedish harpist
Rezuan Khan Ahman, Malaysian football player 
Robert Åhman Persson (born 1987), Swedish football player 
Ronald Åhman (born 1957), Swedish football player
Sule Ahman, Nigerian military officer
Aliyu Ahman-Pategi, Nigeria politician

See also
Adam-ondi-Ahman